The 1935 NFL season was the 16th regular season of the National Football League. The season ended with the Detroit Lions' 26–7 victory over the New York Giants in the NFL Championship Game.

Were it not for the cancellation of a Redskins–Eagles game on November 17 due to heavy snow, all of the teams would have played 12 games, which would have made 1935 the first season in which all NFL teams played the same number of games. The next season to have teams play a different amount of regular season games would end up being , due to a canceled Bills–Bengals game due to an in-game collapse of Damar Hamlin.

Major rule changes

This width lasted for ten seasons, through .

Division races
In the Eastern Division, the key game took place on Thanksgiving Day at Ebbets Field in Brooklyn, as the 5–4 Dodgers hosted the 6–3 Giants.  A Brooklyn win would have tied the teams at 6–4, but New York won, 21–0, and went on to victories in their remaining two games to win the division championship comfortably at 9–3. 

In the Western Division, all 4 teams were in a close race. On Thanksgiving Day the Lions defeated the Bears 14-2 while the Cardinals won over the Packers 9-7, leaving the Lions at 6–3–2 and the Cardinals at 6–3–1.  Three days later on December 1, the Lions defeated Brooklyn 28–0, while the Cardinals tied the Bears 7–7.  With this win, Detroit finished its season at 7–3–2 and eliminated the Packers and Bears from contention, while the Cardinals stood at 6–3–2 with another game against the Bears coming up on December 8.  The Cardinals needed to win in order to force a playoff for the division title. However, the Bears won 13–0, and the Lions were the division champs.

Had the current (post-1972) system of counting ties as half a win and half a loss been in place in 1935, the Packers at 8-4-0 would have tied the 7-3-2 Lions for the Western Division title with .667, requiring a playoff game.

Final standings

NFL Championship Game

Detroit 26, N.Y. Giants 7, at University of Detroit Stadium, in Detroit, Michigan, on December 15.

League leaders

Coaching changes
Boston Redskins: William Dietz was replaced by Eddie Casey.
Brooklyn Dodgers: Cap McEwen was replaced by Paul J. Schissler.
Chicago Cardinals: Paul J. Schissler was replaced by Milan Creighton.
Pittsburgh Pirates: Luby DiMeolo was replaced by Joe Bach.

References

 NFL Record and Fact Book
 NFL History 1931–1940 (Last accessed December 4, 2005)
 Total Football: The Official Encyclopedia of the National Football League

National Football League seasons